BLP may refer to:

Organisations
 Barbados Labour Party, the governing party of Barbados
 Bougainville Labour Party, in Papua New Guinea
 Beer Lovers Party (disambiguation), name of various political parties
 Berwin Leighton Paisner, an international law firm
 BL Publishing, a division of Games Workshop
 BlackLight Power, a pseudoscientific alternative energy company

Other
 Bell–LaPadula model, in information security 
 Bonded Logistics Park, a special economic zone
 Braun's lipoprotein, a membrane protein